Bård Guldvik "Faust" Eithun (born 21 April 1974) is a Norwegian drummer and convicted murderer, known primarily for his work with black metal band Emperor. In 1993, he was sentenced to 14 years in prison for murder. He has been out of prison since 2003.

Education 
Eithun studied at the University of Oslo.

Career

Stigma Diabolicum (1990), Thorns (1990–1992) 
Eithun started his career as a drummer at the age of 16 for the first Stigma Diabolicum demos, Lacus De Luna - Rehearsal and Live in Stjørdal in 1990 and in the Thorns demo, The Thule Tapes in 1992.

Emperor (1992–1994, 2014) 
Eithun is best known for his work with early black metal band Emperor, especially on the releases As the Shadows Rise and the groundbreaking In the Nightside Eclipse. In 2013 Faust returned to Emperor as drummer for the 20th-anniversary tour of In the Nightside Eclipse in the summer of 2014, where they also played the full setlist in Wacken Open Air.

Conviction and release
On 21 August 1992, while Eithun was visiting family in Lillehammer, he stabbed Magne Andreassen to death. According to Eithun, while walking home from a pub through the Olympic park, a well-known gay cruising spot, Andreassen drunkenly approached him and solicited him for sex. Eithun agreed to go with him to the nearby woods and stabbed Andreassen 37 times. He kicked him in the head repeatedly as he lay on the ground.

Eithun claimed that he felt no remorse at the time. Ihsahn, his bandmate in Emperor, said that Eithun "had been very fascinated by serial killers for a long time, and I guess he wanted to know what it's like to kill a person". The media has linked the murder to black metal and speculated that Eithun was motivated by Satanism, fascism, or homophobia. In a 1993 interview, he stated: "I am not a Satanist, but I praise the evil". In an interview for the book Lords of Chaos, he explained that he had been "interested in Satanism but there are other things as well. Basically, I don't give a shit". In a 2008 interview, Eithun said: "I was never a Satanist or fascist in any way". In a 2012 interview he said: "I never had any racist or homophobic views". Gaahl, who is an openly gay member of the Norwegian black metal scene, said that Eithun was the first person to send him a message of support when he came out.  Jørn Inge Tunsberg of the band Hades Almighty said that the murder was "an impulse killing" and that "it had nothing to do with black metal".

Police initially had no suspects, and Eithun remained free for about a year. However, he told Øystein "Euronymous" Aarseth, Varg Vikernes, and a few others what he had done. After Vikernes' murder of Aarseth in August 1993, Eithun was arrested and confessed to killing Andreassen. In 1994, he was sentenced to 14 years imprisonment, but was released due to good behavior in 2003 after serving nine years and four months.

Discography 
 Stigma Diabolicum – various reh-tapes and live-tape from Stjørdalen, Norway 1990
 Thorns – various reh-tapes 1990–1992
 Emperor – Emperor – split CD with Enslaved 1992 (Candlelight)
 Emperor – As the Shadows Rise 1994 (Nocturnal Art Prod)
 Emperor – In the Nightside Eclipse 1994 (Candlelight)
 Cadaver Inc. – a spoken passage on the Kill Tech song featured on Discipline 2001 (Earache)
 Ulver – drums on The Future Sound of Music on Perdition City 2000 (Jester)
 Zyklon – World ov Worms (2001, wrote all lyrics)
 Sigh – lyrics for Nietzschean Conspiracy – Imaginary Sonicscape (2001 album)
 Zyklon – Aeon (2003, wrote all lyrics)
 Blood Tsunami – Demo (2005)
 Scum – Protest Life (single-CD, 2005)
 Scum – Gospels for the Sick (2005)
 Blood Tsunami – Thrash Metal (2007)
 Zyklon – Disintegrate (2006, wrote all lyrics)
 Aborym – Generator (2006)
 Blood Tsunami– Castle of Skulls – demo (2009)
 Blood Tsunami – Grand Feast for Vultures (2009)
 Aborym – Psychogrotesque (2010)
 Aborym – Dirty (2013)
 Blood Tsunami – For Faen! (2013)
 Djevel – Blant svarte graner (2018)
 Blood Tsunami – Grave Condition (2018)
 Djevel – Ormer til armer, maane til hode (2019)
 Djevel – Tanker som rir natten (2021)
 Djevel – Naa skrider natten sort (2022)

In popular culture 
Eithus was played by Valter Skarsgård in the 2018 biographical-horror-thriller film Lords of Chaos.

Bibliography 
 Orcustus, underground zine published by Eithun in the early 1990s

References

Sources

External links 
 Faust interview at About.com

1974 births
Living people
20th-century Norwegian criminals
Norwegian male criminals
Norwegian black metal musicians
Norwegian heavy metal drummers
Male drummers
Norwegian people convicted of murder
People convicted of murder by Norway
21st-century Norwegian drummers
21st-century Norwegian male musicians
Aborym members
Emperor (band) members
Dissection (band) members
Violence against gay men
Violence against men in Europe